Thomas McRedmond (1 July 1838, Birr, County Offaly – 5 April 1904, Blarney, County Cork) was an Irish Roman Catholic bishop.

McRedmond was educated at St Patrick's College, Maynooth and ordained in 1860. He appointed bishop’s chaplain and curate of Nenagh in 1861. He became the first President of the Diocesan College (St Flannan's College), Ennis in 1866; and parish priest of Killaloe and vicar-general in 1876. He was appointed coadjutor bishop of Killaloe in September 1889; and consecrated on 12 January 1890. He succeeded as diocesan on 19 June 1891, and held the post until his death in 1904. He received the degree of Doctor of Divinity (DD).

References

1838 births
1904 deaths
19th-century Roman Catholic bishops in Ireland
Roman Catholic bishops of Killaloe
Alumni of St Patrick's College, Maynooth
People from Birr, County Offaly
20th-century Roman Catholic bishops in Ireland